The Tigray Region, officially the Tigray National Regional State, is the northernmost regional state in Ethiopia. The Tigray Region is the homeland of the Tigrayan, Irob, and Kunama people. Its capital and largest city is Mekelle. Tigray is the fifth-largest by area, the fifth-most populous, and the fifth-most densely populated of the 11 regional states.

Tigray's official language is Tigrinya, similar to that spoken in Eritrea just to the North. The estimated population as of 2019 is 5,443,000. The majority of the population (c. 80%) are farmers, contributing 46% to the regional gross domestic product (2009). The highlands have the highest population density, especially in eastern and central Tigray. The much less densely populated lowlands comprise 48% of Tigray's area. Like many parts of Africa, Tigray is far from a religious monolith. Despite the historical identification of Ethiopia with Orthodox Christianity, the presence of Islam in Ethiopia is as old as the religion itself. The most recent Ethiopian census, collected in 2007, estimates that Muslims make up 34% of the rapidly growing national population. Although the percentage of Muslims in Tigray is only 5 to 10%, it has historically been Islam’s doorway to the region and to Africa at large.  96% of Tigrayans are Orthodox Christian.

Tigray is bordered by Eritrea to the north, Sudan  to the west, the Amhara Region to the south and the Afar Region to the east.  Towns in Tigray include: Mekelle, Adigrat, Axum, Shire, Adwa, Addi Remets, Wukro, Sheraro, Abiy Addi, Atsbi, Hawzen, Adi Gudom, Mai Tsebri, and Zalambessa.

The government of Tigray consists of the executive branch, led by the president, Debretsion Gebremichael; the legislative branch, which comprises the state council; and the judicial branch, which is led by the state supreme court. In early November 2020, a conflict between the Tigray Region, involving the Tigray People's Liberation Front (TPLF) and the Ethiopian federal government began, in which Eritrea took part on the side of the federal government, rapidly escalating into the Tigray War, destabilizing the region, and exposing a well-organized campaign to wipe out the region of ethnic Tigrayans. The campaign was commenced after Abiy Ahmed received the Nobel prize in 2018. Eritrean troops along with ENDF and regional troops were positioned in the Tigray Region. Six hundred thousand Tigrayan casualties have been reported  in the Tigray Genocide.

History

3rd millennium to 1st century BC 
Tigray is often regarded as the cradle of Ethiopian civilization. Its landscape has many historic monuments. Three major monotheistic religions, Judaism, Christianity and Islam arrived in Ethiopia through the Red Sea and then Tigray.

Given the presence of a large temple complex and fertile surroundings, the capital of the 3,000-year-old kingdom of Dʿmt may have been near present-day Yeha. Dʿmt developed irrigation schemes, used the plough, grew millet, and made iron tools and weapons. Some modern historians, including Stuart Munro-Hay, Rodolfo Fattovich, Ayele Bekerie, Cain Felder, and Ephraim Isaac consider this civilization to be indigenous, although Sabaean-influenced due to the latter's dominance of the Red Sea. Others, including Joseph Michels, Henri de Contenson, Tekletsadik Mekuria, and Stanley Burstein, have viewed Dʿmt as the result of a mixture of Sabaean and indigenous peoples. The most recent research, however, shows that Ge'ez, the ancient Semitic language spoken in Tigray, Eritrea and northern Ethiopia in ancient times, is not likely to have been derived from Sabaean. There is evidence of a Semitic-speaking presence in Tigray, Eritrea and northern Ethiopia at least as early as 2000 BC. It is now believed that Sabaean influence was minor, limited to a few localities and disappearing after a few decades or a century, It may have represented a trading or military colony, in some sort of symbiosis or military alliance with the civilization of Dʿmt or some other proto-Aksumite state.

After the fall of Dʿmt in the 5th century BC, the plateau came to be dominated by smaller, unknown successor kingdoms. This lasted until the rise of one of these polities during the first century BC, the Aksumite Kingdom, which succeeded in reunifying the area and is, in effect, the ancestor of medieval and modern states in Eritrea and Ethiopia using the name "Ethiopia" as early as the 4th century.

1st to 10th century AD 

The Kingdom of Aksum was a trading empire rooted in Eritrea and northern Ethiopia. It existed from approximately 100–940 AD, growing from the proto-Aksumite Iron Age period c. 4th century BC to achieve prominence by the 1st century AD.

According to the Book of Axum, Axum's first capital, Mazaber, was built by Itiyopis, son of Cush. The capital was later moved to Aksum in northern Ethiopia.

The Empire of Aksum, at its height, at times extended across most of present-day Eritrea, Ethiopia, Djibouti, Sudan, Yemen and Saudi Arabia. The capital city of the empire was Axum, now in northern Ethiopia. Today a smaller community, the city of Axum was once a bustling metropolis and a cultural and economic hub. Two hills and two streams lie on the east and west expanses of the city; perhaps providing the initial impetus for settling this area. Along the hills and plain outside the city, the Aksumites had cemeteries with elaborate grave stones, which are called stelae, or obelisks. Other important cities included Yeha, Hawulti-Melazo, Matara, Adulis, and Qohaito, the last three of which are now in Eritrea. By the reign of Endubis in the late 3rd century, Aksum had begun minting its own currency and was named by Mani as one of the four great powers of his time, along with China and the Sassanid and Roman empires. It converted to Christianity in 325 or 328 under King Ezana and was the first state to use the image of the cross on its coins.

11th to 19th century AD 

In the 14th century the Tigrinya-speaking lands (Tigray-Mareb Melash) were divided into two provinces, separated by the Mereb River, by the newly enthroned Agaw (not Amhara) emperors. The governor of the northern province received the title Bahre Negash (Ruler of the sea), whereas the governor of the southern province was given the title of Tigray Mekonen (Lord of Tigray). The Portuguese Jesuit Emanuele Baradas's work titled "Do reino de Tigr", written in 1633–34, states that the "Reino de Tigr" (Kingdom of Tigray) extended from Hamasien to Temben, from the borders of Dankel to the Adwa mountain. He also stated that Tigray-Mereb Melash was divided into 24 smaller political units (principalities), twelve of which were located south of the Mereb and governed by the Tigray Mekonen, based in Enderta. The other twelve were located north of the Mereb, under the authority of the Bahre Negash, based in the district of Serae.

The Book of Aksum, likely written and compiled before the 15th century, shows a traditional schematic map of Tigray with the city of Aksum at its center, surrounded by the 13 principal provinces: "Tembien, Shire, Serae, Hamasien, Bur, Sam’a, Agame, Amba Senayt, Garalta, Enderta, Sahart and Abergele."

During the Middle Ages, the position of Tigray Mekonnen ("Governor of Tigray") was established to rule over the area. Other districts included Akele Guzay (now part of Eritrea), and the kingdom of the Bahr negus, who ruled much of what is now Eritrea and Shire district and town in Western Tigray. At the time when Tigray Mekonnen existed simultaneously with that of Bahr negus, their frontier seems to have been the Mareb River, which is currently constitutes the border between the Ethiopian province of Tigray and Eritrea.

After the loss of power of the Bahr negus in the aftermath of Bahr negus Yeshaq's rebellions,  By the unsettled Zemene Mesafint period ("Era of the Princes"), both designations had declined to little more than empty titles, and the lord who succeeded them used (and received from the Emperor) the title of either Ras or Dejazmach, beginning with Ras Mikael Sehul. Rulers of Tigray such as Ras Wolde Selassie alternated with others, chiefly those of Begemder or Yejju, as warlords to maintain the Ethiopian monarchy during the Zemene Mesafint.

In the mid-19th century, the lords of Tembien and Enderta managed to establish an overlordship of Tigray. One of its members, Dejazmach Kahsay Mercha, ascended the imperial throne in 1872 under the name Yohannes IV. Following his 1889 death in the Battle of Metemma, the Ethiopian throne came under the control of the king of Shewa, and the center of power shifted south and away from Tigray.

20th century 
In 1943, open resistance broke out all over southern and eastern Tigray under the slogan, "there is no government; let's organize and govern ourselves". Throughout Enderta Awraja, including Mekelle, Didibadergiajen, Hintalo, Saharti, Samre and Wajirat, Raya Awraja, Kilte-Awlaelo Awraja and Tembien Awraja, local assemblies, called gerreb, were formed. The gerreb sent representatives to a central congress, called the shengo, which elected leaders and established a military command system. Although the first Woyane rebellion of 1943 had shortcomings as a prototype revolution, historians agree that it involved a fairly high level of spontaneity and peasant initiative. It demonstrated considerable popular participation and reflected widely shared grievances. The uprising was specifically directed against the central Shoan Amhara regime of Haile Selassie I, rather than the Tigrayan imperial elite.

Ethiopian Civil War 

After the February 1974 popular revolution, the first signal of any mass uprising was the actions of the soldiers of the 4th Brigade of the 4th Army Division in Nagelle in southern Ethiopia. The Coordinating Committee of the Armed Forces, Police, and Territorial Army, or the Derg (Ge'ez "Committee"), was officially announced 28 June 1974 by a group of military officers. The committee elected Major Mengistu Haile Mariam as its chairman and Major Atnafu Abate as its vice-chairman. In July 1974, the Derg obtained key concessions from the emperor, Haile Selassie, which included the power to arrest not only military officers but government officials at every level. Soon both former Prime Ministers Tsehafi Taezaz Aklilu Habte-Wold and Endalkachew Makonnen, along with most of their cabinets, most regional governors, many senior military officers and officials of the Imperial court were imprisoned. In August 1974, after a proposed constitution creating a constitutional monarchy was presented to the emperor, the Derg began a program of dismantling the imperial government in order to forestall further developments in that direction. The Derg deposed and imprisoned the emperor on 12 September 1974.

In addition, the Derg in 1975 nationalized most industries and private and somewhat secure urban real-estate holdings. But mismanagement, corruption, and general hostility to the Derg's violent rule, coupled with the draining effects of constant warfare with the separatist guerrilla movements in Tigray, led to a drastic fall in general productivity of food and cash crops. In October 1978, the Derg announced the National Revolutionary Development Campaign to mobilize human and material resources to transform the economy, which led to a Ten-Year Plan (1984/1985-1993/1994) to expand agricultural and industrial output, forecasting a 6.5% growth in GDP and a 3.6% rise in per capita income. Instead per capita income declined 0.8% over this period. Famine scholar Alex de Waal observes that while the famine that struck the country in the mid-1980s is usually ascribed to drought, "closer investigation shows that widespread drought occurred only some months after the famine was already under way". Hundreds of thousands fled economic misery, conscription, and political repression, and went to live in neighboring countries and all over the Western world, creating an Ethiopian diaspora.

Toward the end of January 1991, a coalition of rebel forces, the Ethiopian People's Revolutionary Democratic Front (EPRDF) captured Gondar, the ancient capital city, Bahar Dar, and Dessie.

Postwar 
John Young, who visited the area several times in the early 1990s, attributes this delay in part to "central budget restraint, structural readjustment, and lack of awareness by government bureaucrats in Addis Ababa of conditions in the province", but notes "an equally significant obstacle was posed by an entrenched, and largely Amhara-dominated, central bureaucracy which used its power to block government-authorised funds from reaching Tigray". At the same time, a growing urban middle class of traders, businessmen and government officials emerged that was suspicious of and distant from the victorious EPRDF.
From 1991 to 2001, the president of Tigray was Gebru Asrat.
In 1998, war erupted between Eritrea and Ethiopia over a portion of territory that had been administered as part of Tigray, which included the town of Badme. A 2002 United Nations decision awarded much of this land to Eritrea, but Ethiopia did not accept the ruling until 2018, when a bilateral agreement ended the border conflict. The text of this agreement has not been publicly availed.

21st century 

From 2001 to 2010 the president was Tsegay Berhe.

2020 administrative reorganisation 

Between 2018 and 2020, as part of a reform aimed to deepen and strengthen decentralisation, woredas were reorganised, and new boundaries established. As smaller towns had been growing, they had started providing a larger range of services, such as markets and even banks, that encouraged locals to travel there rather than to their formal woreda centre. However, these locals still had to travel to their local woreda centre for most local government services - often in a different direction. In 2018 and 2019, after multiple village discussions that were often vigorous in the more remote areas, 21 independent urban administrations were added and other boundaries re-drawn, resulting in an increase from 35 to 88 woredas in January 2020.

Tigray War 

Following the 2020 Tigray regional election, after months of preparation with the Eritrean army, as demonstrated by the Eritrean president visiting the Ethiopian air force on October 14, 2020, the Ethiopian military launched attacks on the government of Tigray headquarters in Mekelle on 4 November, marking the beginning of the Tigray War. Ethiopian troops as well as Amhara militia advanced through southern Tigray, while Eritrean troops occupied border towns in northern Tigray. Amhara militias also occupied Western Tigray and still do as of 2023.

Warfare, the COVID-19 pandemic in Ethiopia, and a locust outbreak all contributed to an emergency food situation in the region in January 2021. Two million people faced food shortages; the situation was particularly dire in Shire Inda Selassie, where there are 100,000 refugees. The Famine Early Warning Systems Network said parts of central and eastern Tigray are likely in emergency phase 4, a step below famine.

Geography

Location and size 
Tigray is situated between 12° – 15°N and 36° 30' – 40° 30'E.

The figure of 50,079 km2 is supported by the Google Maps area calculator.

Geology

Overview 
The East African Orogeny led to the growth of a mountain chain in the Precambrian (up to 800 Ma [million years ago]), which was largely eroded afterwards. Around 600 Ma, the Gondwana break-up led to the presence of tectonic structures and a Palaeozoic planation surface, that extents to the north and west of the Dogu'a Tembien massif.

Subsequently, there was the deposition of sedimentary and volcanic formations, from older (at the foot of the massif) to younger, near the summits. From Palaeozoic to Triassic, Tigray was located near the South Pole. The (reactivate) Precambrian extensional faults guided the deposition of glacial sediments (Edaga Arbi Glacials and Enticho Sandstone). Later alluvial plain sediments were deposited (Adigrat Sandstone). The break-up of Gondwana (Late Palaeozoic to Early Triassic) led to an extensional tectonic phase, what caused the lowering of large parts of the Horn of Africa. As a consequence a marine transgression occurred, leading to the deposition of marine sediments (Antalo Limestone and Agula Shale). The region has an estimated 3.89 billion tons of mostly "excellent" quality oil shale.

At the end of the Mesozoic tectonic phase, a new (Cretaceous) planation took place. After that, the deposition of continental sediments (Amba Aradam Formation) indicates the presence of less shallow seas, probably caused by a regional uplift. At the beginning of the Caenozoic, there was a relative tectonic quiescence, during which the Amba Aradam Sandstones were partially eroded, which led to the formation of a new planation surface.

In the Eocene, the Afar plume, a broad regional uplift, deformed the lithosphere, leading to the eruption of flood basalts. Three major formations may be distinguished: lower basalts, interbedded lacustrine deposits and upper basalts. Almost at the same time, the Mekelle Dolerite intruded into the Mesozoic sediments, following joints and faults.

A new magma intrusion occurred in the Early Miocene, which gave rise to phonolite plugs, mainly in the Adwa area and also in Dogu’a Tembien. The present geomorphology is marked by deep valleys, eroded as a result of the regional uplift. Throughout the Quaternary, deposition of alluvium and freshwater tufa occurred in the valley bottoms.

Fossils 
In Tigray, there are two main fossil-bearing geological units. The Antalo Limestone (upper Jurassic) is the largest. Its marine deposits comprise mainly benthic marine invertebrates. Also, the Tertiary lacustrine deposits, interbedded in the basalt formations, contain a range of silicified mollusc fossils.

In the Antalo Limestone: large Paracenoceratidae cephalopods (nautilus); Nerineidae indet.; sea urchins; Rhynchonellid brachiopod; crustaceans; coral colonies; crinoid stems.

In the Tertiary silicified lacustrine deposits: Pila (gastropod); Lanistes sp.; Pirenella conica; and land snails (Achatinidae indet.).

All snail shells, both fossil and recent, are called t’uyo in Tigrinya language, which means ‘helicoidal’.

Traditional uses of rock 
As Tigray holds a wide variety of rock types, there is expectedly a varied use of rock.
 Natural stone masonry. Preferentially, the easier shaped limestone and sandstone are used to build homesteads and churches, but particularly in the upland areas, basalt is also used. Traditionally, fermented mud will be used as mortar
 Fencing of homesteads, generally in dry stones
 Church bells, generally three elongated plates in phonolite or clinkstone, with different tonalities
 Milling stone: for this purpose plucked-bedrock pits, small rock-cut basins that naturally occur in rivers with kolks, are excavated from the river bed and further shaped. Milling is done at home using an elongated small boulder
 Door and window lintels, prepared from rock types that frequently have an elongated shape (sandstone, phonolite, limestone), or that are easily shaped (tufa)
 Troughs for livestock watering and feeding, generally hewn from tufa
 Footpath paving, generally done as community work. Some very ancient paved footpaths occur on major communication lines dating back to the period before the introduction of the automobile
 foot travellers stop, pray and put an additional stone
 Stones collected from farmlands in order to free space for the crop, and heaped in typical rounded metres-high heaps, called zala
 Contour bunding or gedeba: terrace walls in dry stone, typically laid out along the contour for sake of soil conservation
 Check dams or qetri in gullies for sake of gully erosion control
 Cobble stones, used for paving secondary streets in the towns. Generally limestone is used.

Major mountains 
 Ferrah Imba, 3954 metres, summit of the Tsibet massif in Endamekoni woreda, and highest peak of Tigray
 Imba Alaje, 3438 metres, in Alaje woreda
 Mugulat, 3263 metres, in Ganta Afeshum woreda; one of its spurs is crossed by the Siqurto foot tunnel
 Asimba, 3199 metres, in Irob woreda
 Upper plateaus of the Atsbi Horst at 3057 metres in Atsbi Wenberta woreda
 Maebino, 3031 metres, in Irob woreda
 Imba Tsion, 2917 metres, in Hawzen woreda
 Ekli Imba, 2799 metres, summit of the Arebay massif in Degua Tembien woreda
 Imba Aradom – sometimes transliterated as Amba Aradam, 2756 metres, in Hintalo Wajirat woreda
 Soloda, 2436 metres, part of the Adwa plugs in Adwa woreda
 Imba Neway, 2388 metres, in Abergele (woreda)()

Water challenge 
Overall, the region is semi-arid. The wet season lasts only for a couple of months. The farmers are adapted to this, but the problem arises when rains are less than normal. Another major challenge is providing water to urban areas. Smaller towns, but particularly Mekelle, face endemic water shortages. Reservoirs have been built, but their management is sub-optimal.

Wildlife

Large mammals 

Besides elephants in Western Tigray and the endemic gelada baboon on the highest mountains, large mammals in the region, with scientific (italics), English and Tigrinya language names, are:

 Cercopithecus aethiops; grivet monkey, ወዓግ
 Crocuta crocuta, spotted hyena, ዝብኢ
 Caracal caracal, caracal, ጭክ ኣንበሳ
 Panthera pardus, leopard, ነብሪ
 Xerus rutilus, unstriped ground squirrel, ምጹጽላይ or ጨጨራ
 Canis mesomelas, black-backed jackal, ቡኳርያ
 Canis anthus, golden jackal, ቡኳርያ
 Papio hamadryas, hamadryas baboon, ጋውና
 Procavia capensis, rock hyrax, ጊሐ
 Felis silvestris, African wildcat, ሓክሊ ድሙ
 Civettictis civetta, African civet, ዝባድ
 Papio anubis, olive baboon, ህበይ
 Ichneumia albicauda, white-tailed mongoose, ፂሒራ
 Herpestes ichneumon, large grey mongoose, ፂሒራ
 Hystrix cristata, crested porcupine, ቅንፈዝ
 Oreotragus oreotragus; klipspringer, ሰስሓ
 Orycteropus afer, aardvark, ፍሒራ
 Genetta genetta, common genet, ስልሕልሖት
 Lepus capensis, cape hare, ማንቲለ
 Mellivora capensis, honey badger, ትትጊ

Small rodents 
The most common pest rodents with widespread distribution in agricultural fields and storage areas are three Ethiopian endemic species: the Dembea grass rat (Arvicanthis dembeensis, sometimes considered a subspecies of Arvicanthis niloticus), Ethiopian white-footed rat (Stenocephalemys albipes), and Awash multimammate mouse (Mastomys awashensis).

Bats 
Bats occur in natural caves, church buildings and abandoned homesteads. The large colony of bats that roosts in Zeyi cave comprises Hipposideros megalotis (Ethiopian large-eared roundleaf bat), Hipposideros tephrus, and Rhinolophus blasii (Blasius's horseshoe bat).

Birds 
With its numerous exclosures, forest fragments and church forests, Tigray is a birdwatcher's paradise. Detailed inventories list at least 170 bird species, including numerous endemic species.
Species belonging to the Afrotropical Highland Biome occur in the dry evergreen montane forests of the highland plateau but can also occupy other habitats. Wattled Ibis can be found feeding in wet grassland and open woodland. Black-winged Lovebird, Banded Barbet, Golden-mantled or Abyssinian Woodpecker, Montane White-eye, Rüppell's Robin-chat, Abyssinian Slaty Flycatcher and Tacazze Sunbird are found in evergreen forest, mountain woodlands and areas with scattered trees including fig trees, Euphorbia abyssinica and Juniperus procera. Erckel's spurfowl, Dusky Turtle Dove, Swainson's or Grey-headed Sparrow, Baglafecht Weaver, African Citril, Brown-rumped Seedeater and Streaky Seedeater are common Afrotropical breeding residents of woodland edges, scrubland and forest edges. White-billed Starling and Little Rock Thrush can be found on steep cliffs; Speckled or African rock pigeon and White-collared Pigeon in gorges and rocky places but also in towns and villages.

Species belonging to the Somali-Masai Biome. Hemprich's Hornbill and White-rumped Babbler are found in bushland, scrubland and dense secondary forest, often near cliffs, gorges or water. Chestnut-Winged or Somali Starling and Rüppell's Weaver are found in bushy and shrubby areas. Black-billed wood hoopoes have some red at the base of the bill or an entirely red bill in this area.

Species belonging to the Sudan-Guinea Savanna Biome: Green-backed eremomela and Chestnut-crowned Sparrow-Weaver.

Species that are neither endemic nor biome-restricted but that have restricted ranges or that can be more easily seen in Ethiopia than elsewhere in their range: Abyssinian Roller is an Ethiopian relative of Lilac-breasted Roller, which is an intra-tropical breeding migrant of south and east Africa, and of European Roller, an uncommon Palearctic passage migrant. Black-billed Barbet, Yellow-breasted Barbet and Grey-headed Batis are species from the Sahel and Northern Africa but also occur in Acacia woodlands in the area.

The most regularly observed raptor birds in crop fields in Tigray are Augur buzzard (Buteo augur), Common Buzzard (Buteo buteo), Steppe Eagle (Aquila nipalensis), Lanner falcon (Falco biarmicus), Black kite (Milvus migrans), Yellow-billed kite (Milvus aegyptius) and Barn owl (Tyto alba).

Birdwatching can be done particularly in exclosures and forests. Eighteen bird-watching sites have been inventoried in Enderta and Degua Tembien and mapped.

Administrative zones and districts 

Like other Regions in Ethiopia, Tigray is subdivided into administrative zones, and further into woredas or districts. Up to January 2020, these were the woredas of Tigray:

 Central Tigray
 Abergele
 Abiy Addi Town
 Adwa
 Adwa Town
 Aksum Town
 Dogu'a Tembien
 Enticho
 Kola Tembien
 La'ilay Maychew
 Mereb Lehe
 Naeder Adet
 Tahtay Maychew
 Werie Lehe
 East Tigray
 Adigrat Town
 Atsbi Wenberta
 Ganta Afeshum
 Gulomahda
 Hawzen
 Irob
 Kilte Awulaelo
 Saesi Tsaedaemba
 Wukro Town
 North West Tigray
 Asigede Tsimbela
 La'ilay Adiyabo
 Medebay Zana
 Tahtay Adiyabo
 Tahtay Koraro
 Tselemti
 Shiraro Town
 Shire Town
 South Tigray (Disputed)
 Alaje
 Alamata
 Alamata Town
 Endamehoni
 Korem Town
 Maychew Town
 Ofla
 Raya Azebo
 South East Tigray
 Enderta
 Hintalo Wajirat
 Samre
 West Tigray (Disputed)
 Kafta Humera
 Humera Town
 Wolqayt
 Tsegede
 Mekelle (special zone)

In 2018 and 2019, after multiple village discussions that were often vigorous in the more remote areas, 21 independent urban administrations were added and other boundaries re-drawn, resulting in an increase from 35 to 88 woredas in January 2020:

 Central Tigray
 Abergele
 Adet
 Abiy Addi Town
 Adwa
 Adwa Town
 Ahlerorn
 Ahsea
 Aksum Town
 Chila
 Egada Arbi
 Egela
 Emba Seneyti
 Endaleiasi
 Enticho Town
 Hahayle
 Kayeh Tekli
 Kola Temben
 Laelay Maychew
 Naeder
 Rama
 Tahtay Maychew
 Tanqwa Melash
 East Tigray
 Adigrat Town
 Agulae
 Atsbi
 Atsbi Town
 Bizet
 Edaga Hamus Town
 Erob
 Freweyni Town
 Ganta Afeshum
 Geralta
 Hawzen
 Hawzen Town
 Irob
 Kelete Awelallo
 Saesie
 Tsaeda Emba
 Wukro Town
 Zala Anbesa Town
 North West Tigray
 Adi Daero
 Adi Hageray
 Asgede
 Dima
 Endabaguna Town
 Indasilassie
 Laelay Adiabo
 May Tsebri Town
 Selekleka
 Seyemti Adyabo
 Sheraro Town
 Tahtay Adiyabo
 Tahtay Koraro
 Tselemti
 Tsimbia
 Zena
 South Tigray
 Alamata Town
 Bora
 Chercher
 Emba Alaje
 Endamehoni
 Korem Town
 Maichew Town
 Mekhoni Town
 Neqsage
 Ofla
 Raya Alamata
 Raya Azebo
 Selewa
 Zata
 South East Tigray
 Adigudom
 Dogua Temberi
 Enderta
 Hagere Setam Town
 Hintalo
 Saharti
 Samre
 Wajirat
 West Tigray
 Awora
 Dansha Town
 Kafta Humera
 Korant
 May Gaba
 May Kadra
 Setit Hemera
 Tsegede
 Welkalt
 Mekelle (special zone)

Major cities 

Mekelle, home to Mekelle University, Mekelle Institute of Technology, Tigray Institute of Policy Studies, Admas University, Microlink College, Nile College, and Mekelle College of Teacher Education is the capital of Tigray, near the geographic center of the state.

Other Tigray cities functioning as centers of Ethiopian metropolitan areas include:
 Adigrat (home of Adigrat University, Debre Damo monastery and Addis Pharmaceutical Factory)
 Adwa (home of Adwa Pan African University,)
 Axum (home of Aksum University,)
 Maychew (home of Raya University)

Of the 10 largest cities in Tigray, Maychew has the highest elevation at 2479 meter above sea level. Plenty of smaller towns, like Atsbi and Edaga Hamus are located at even higher elevations. Of the large cities, Humera is located at the lowest altitude (585 m).

Government and politics

Executive branch 
The executive branch is headed by the Chief Administrator of  Tigray. The current president is Debretsion Gebremichael, a TPLF member, elected in 2018 and again in 2020. A Vice President of Tigray succeeds the president in the event of any removal from office, and performs any duties assigned by the president. The current vice president is Dr. Addis Alem Balema. The other elected constitutional offices in the executive branch are the Regional Health Bureau (Ato Hagos Godefy), Educational Bureau (Ato Gebre'egziabher), Auditor General (Ato Alemseged Kebedew), and 12 other officials.

Judicial branch 
There are three levels of the Tigray state judiciary. The lowest level is the court of common pleas: each woreda maintains its own constitutionally mandated court of common pleas, which maintain jurisdiction over all justiciable matters. The intermediate-level court system is the district court system. Four courts of appeals exist, each retaining jurisdiction over appeals from common pleas, municipal, and county courts in an administrative zone. A case heard in this system is decided by a three-judge panel, and each judge is elected.

The highest-ranking court, the Tigray Supreme Court, is Tigray's "court of last resort". A seven-justice panel composes the court, which, by its own discretion, hears appeals from the courts of appeals, and retains original jurisdiction over limited matters. The chief judge is called the President of Tigray Supreme Court (W/ro Hirity Miheretab).

Legislative branch 
The State Council, which is the highest administrative body of the state, is made up of 152 members.

National politics 
Tigray is represented by 38 representatives in the Federal Democratic Republic of Ethiopia House of Peoples' Representatives. But currently after the illegitimate postponement of the national election of Ethiopia Tigray has pulled it representative from the House of House of Peoples' Representatives and has no representation in the Federal parliament .

Demographics 

Based on the 2007 census conducted by the Central Statistical Agency of Ethiopia (CSA), the Tigray Region has a population of 4,316,988, of whom 2,126,465 are men and 2,190,523 women; urban inhabitants number 844,040 or 19.55% of the population. With an estimated area of 84,722 km2, the region had an estimated density of 51 people per km2. In the entire region 992,635 households were counted, for an average of 4.4 people per household, with urban households having on average 3.4 and rural households 4.6.

In the previous census, conducted in 1994, the region's population was 3,136,267, of whom 1,542,165 were men and 1,594,102 women; urban inhabitants numbered 621,210, or 14% of the population.

According to the CSA, 53.99% of the total population had access to safe drinking water, of whom 42.68% were rural inhabitants and 97.28% were urban. Values for other reported common indicators of the standard of living for Tigray  include: 31.6% of the inhabitants fall into the lowest wealth quintile; adult literacy for men is 67.5% and for women 33.7%; and the infant mortality rate is 67 infant deaths per 1,000 live births, less than the national average of 77; at least half of these deaths occurred in the infants' first month of life.

The predominant religion in Tigray is Orthodox Christianity

Ethnicity 

With 96.55% of the local population, the region is predominantly inhabited by the Tigrinya-speaking Tigrayan people. The Tigrinya language belongs to the Semitic branch of the Afro-Asiatic family of languages. Most other residents hail from other Afro-Asiatic-speaking communities, including the Amhara, Irob, Afar, Agaw and Oromo. Partly assimilated Oromo live in remoter villages in Raya Azebo and Alamata (woreda), whereas there are Agaw in Abergele (woreda). There are also Nilo-Saharan-speaking Kunama as well.

Languages 
The working language is Tigrinya. Saho and Kunama are also spoken, and people in urban areas are also able to speak Amharic.

Notable people 

Mehari Taddele Maru, author, professor at European university Institute
Tedros Adhanom Ghebreyesus, Director General, World Health Organization WHO
Meles Zenawi Asres, Prime Minister, Ethiopia 1995–2012
Zeresenay Alemseged, Anthropologist, known for his discovery of Selam, also referred to as "Lucy’s child", the almost-complete fossilized remains of a 3.3 million-year-old child of the species Australopithecus afarensis.

Agriculture

Cropping

Terracing and dam construction 

An important aspect of the agricultural work in Tigray after the end of the 1991 civil war was to minimize the problems of drought. In the past, Tigray was covered with forests and had a micro-climate that favoured the rains. Subsequently, the forests were cut down, usually to impoverish the population during the wars. Consequently, Tigray achieved a fair amount of rainfall during the rainy season, from August to September, but quickly lost these waters downstream. In the process the fertile soil of the fields eroded. After a few weeks of rain, the country again dried up.

The government undertook two projects in Tigray. The first was the construction of terraces which, with the agreement and help of local communities, go up to the tops of the mountains at 2,500 metres. The goal was to prevent the rainfall flowing away immediately so that it could be conserved for the agricultural season. On the highest terraces were planted trees, mainly eucalyptus, the dominant tree in Ethiopia and native to Australia. These plants created a new microclimate. The terracing method was very simple but required good organization. Long stretches of the fields were terraced by the villagers using stone walls from stones that erosion had exposed. The rains eroding the still non-terraced ground formed mudslides that were held by the topmost walls, which permitted construction of a new terrace field and another wall with uncovered stones, creating new ground terraced farmland every year.

Another endeavour involved the construction of small reservoirs for local irrigation. As rains last only for a couple of months per year, reservoirs of different sizes allow harvesting runoff from the rainy season for further use in the dry season. The dams needed to create these basins are typically an embankment of a few hundreds of meters, closing off one part of a valley, with a maximum height of 20 metres. Each took months of work, in which people carried earth on their back, and with assistance of donkeys. Generally 2,000–3,000 people — men, women and children — carried the earth in simple baskets.

The small reservoirs in Tigray include:

 Addi Abagiè
 Addi Akhor
 Addi Amharay
 May Leiba
 Hiza'iti Wedi Cheber
 Addi Asme'e
 Chini
 Addi Gela
 Addi Hilo
 Addi Qenafiz
 Addi Shihu
 Aqushela
 Arato
 Belesat
 Betqua
 Chichat
 Dibdibo
 Dur Anbesa
 Imbagedo
 Inda Zib'i
 Era (reservoir)
 Era Quhila
 Gereb Mihiz
 Filiglig
 Gereb May Zib'i
 Gereb Bi'ati
 Gereb Awso
 Felaga
 Gereb Segen (Hintalo)
 Gereb Segen (May Gabat)
 Gereb Shegal
 Ginda'i
 Godew

Overall, these reservoirs suffer from rapid siltation. Part of the water that could be used for irrigation is lost through seepage; the positive side-effect is that this contributes to groundwater recharge.

Vegetation and enclosures 

Tigray holds numerous exclosures, areas that are set aside for regreening. Logging and livestock grazing are not allowed there. Besides effects on biodiversity, water infiltration, protection from flooding, sediment deposition, carbon sequestration, people commonly have economic benefits from these exclosures through grass harvesting, beekeeping and other non-timber forest products. The local inhabitants also consider it as "land set aside for future generations". In Dogu'a Tembien, several exclosures are managed by the EthioTrees project. They have as an additional benefit that the villagers receive carbon credits for the sequestered CO2, as part of a carbon offset programme. The revenues are then reinvested in the villages, according to the priorities of the communities; it may be for an additional class in the village school, a water pond, conservation in the exclosures, or a store for incense.

Livestock 

The CSA estimated in 2005 that farmers in Tigray had a total of 2,713,750 cattle (representing 7.0% of Ethiopia's total cattle), 72,640 sheep (0.42%), 208,970 goats (1.61%), 1,200 horses (less than 0.1%), 9,190 mules (6.24%), 386,600 asses (15.43%), 32,650 camels (7.15%), 3,180,240 poultry of all species (10.3%), and 20,480 beehives (0.47%). Cattle are an essential component in the dominant grain-plough agricultural system. In the rainy season, a large part of the cattle herds are in transhumance.

Mainly used for draught, there are several cattle landraces in Tigray:
 Arado cattle, the dominant variety
 Raya cattle, long horned, especially raised in Southern Tigray and traded widely as plough oxen
 Irob cattle, particularly in the Irob woreda
 Abergele cattle, particularly in Abergele (woreda) and on the southwestern slopes of Dogu’a Tembien
 Begayt cattle, in western Tigray. They are known for better milk production
 In small towns: Cross-bred Arado x Begayt, and Arado x Holstein-Friesian milk cows

Landmarks 

A distinctive feature of Tigray are its rock-hewn churches. Similar in design to those of Lalibela in the Amhara Region, these churches are found in four or five clusters – Gheralta, Teka-Tesfay, Atsbi and Tembien – with Wukro sometimes included. Some of the churches are considered earlier than those of Lalibela, perhaps dating from the eighth century. Mostly monolithic, with designs partly inspired by classical architecture, they are often located at the top of cliffs or steep hills, for security. For example, Tigray's ancient Debre Damo monastery is accessible only by climbing a rope 25 metres up a sheer cliff.

Looting has become a major issue in the Tigray Region, as archaeological sites have become sources for construction materials and ancient artifacts used for everyday purposes by local populations.

The area is famous for a single rock sculptured 23 meter long obelisk in Axum as well as for other fallen obelisks. The Axum treasure site of ancient Tigrayan history is a major landmark. Yeha is another important local landmark that is little-known outside the region.

Transport

Ground travel 
A major north–south road corridor goes through Tigray. This is facilitated by Highway 2 which goes from Adigrat to Addis Ababa and Highway 3 which goes from Shire to Addis Ababa.

Air travel 

Tigray has one international airport and four commercial airports. The international airport is Alula Aba Nega Airport (MQX) near Mekelle. The region's four other commercial airports are Shire Airport (SHC), Humera Airport (HUE), Dansha Airport, and Emperor Yohannes IV Airport (AXU), which serves Axum.

Sports 
Mekelle 70 Enderta F.C. (Tigrinya: ጋንታ መቐለ 70 እንደርታ) is an Ethiopian football club based in the capital, Mekelle. They are a member of the Ethiopian Football Federation and currently play in the top division of Ethiopian football, the Ethiopian Premier League. They are known by the nickname the Lion of Judah (ምዓም ኣንበሳ /ምዓም አናብስት/ኣናብስቶቹ). The club won its first Ethiopian Premier League title in the 2018–2019 Ethiopian Premier League Season.

Shire Indasillasie F.C. (Tigrinya: ጋንታ ስሑል ሽረ, also known as Sihul Shire FC) is an Ethiopian football club based in Shire. They are a member of the Ethiopian Football Federation and play in the Ethiopian Premier League, the first division of football in Ethiopia.

Mekele City, Suhul Shire, and Adigrat University football clubs were Tigray-based clubs among the 14 clubs to participate in the Ethiopian Premier League in 2020/2021. However, due to the war, they were replaced by other clubs from the League one rank below the Ethiopian Premier League.

Tigrayans are known for their good performance in circus and road cycling. For many years cyclists from this region have been dominant in Ethiopian cycle championships. Tsgabu Gebremaryam Grmay is one of the best Ethiopian cyclists and the first Ethiopian to participate in the Tour de France.

Education 
At the regional level, the Tigray Education Bureau governs primary and secondary educational institutions. At the municipal level, there are approximately 300 school districts region-wide.

Colleges and universities 

 Adigrat University
 Axum University
 Adwa Pan-African University
 Ethio-lmage College
 Greenwich College
 Hashenge College
 Mars Engineering College
 Mekelle University
 Mekelle Institute of Technology
 New Millennium College
 Nile College
 Raya University
 Sehba Info Tech & Business College
 Signal College
 St. Mary's University College
 Winner college Axum

Libraries 
Tigray is home to Ethiopia's most extensive church libraries that are found in the eastern and central zones of the region. There are several ongoing digitization projects to preserve previous historical texts.

 Axum Heritage Foundation
 Romanat Qeddus Mika'el Church
 Gunda Gunde Monastery
 Agwaza Monastery
 Debre Damo Monastery

Non-governmental organisations 
Major NGOs, involved in development activities are:
Relief Society of Tigray
Tigrai Development Association
Tegaru Disaster Relief Fund (TDRF)

Notes

References

External links 

 Tigray Region Web Portal
 Tigray Revenue Development Authority 
 Tigray State Information
 FDRE States: Basic Information – Tigray
 Map of Tigray Region at DPPA of Ethiopia
 Endowment Fund for the Rehabilitation of Tigray website
 Ethiopian Treasures – Queen of Sheba, Aksumite Kingdom – Aksum
 Ethiopian Treasures – Emperor Yohannes IV Castle – Mekele
 Future Observatory – Dam Building in Tigray by David Mercer
 "Tigrayans want end to border row" by Elizabeth Blunt, BBC News, 20 December 2007
 Tigray: Then and Now – the son of Mohamed Amin covers sustainable agriculture in Tigray following the Horn of Africa drought in 2011.

 
Regions of Ethiopia